Alejandro "Alex" Lara (born September 15, 1998) is an American professional soccer player who plays as a defender for USL Championship club Monterey Bay FC.

Career

Youth, college and amateur
Lara played one season with USSDA side Arsenal in 2015–2016, before playing college soccer at Mt. San Antonio College. After one season at Mt. SAC, Lara transferred to California State University, Northridge, where he played three more seasons. During his time with the Matadors, Lara made 53 appearances, scoring 2 goals and tallying 2 assists.

While at college, Lara also appeared in the USL League Two for both Weston FC in 2017, and Ventura County Fusion during their 2019 season.

Professional
On December 13, 2019, Lara signed his professional contract with USL Championship side Hartford Athletic. He made his debut on July 17, 2020, appearing as an injury time substitute during a 1–0 win over New York Red Bulls II. On September 30, Lara scored his first professional goal in Hartford's 3–2 win over Philadelphia Union II. Lara finished the 2020 season fourth on the team in blocks (4), clearances (33), interceptions (23) and tackles won (13) in 13 games played. He re signed with Hartford for the 2021 season in December 2020.
On March 3, 2022, Lara signed with USL Championship side Las Vegas Lights.

Lara joined Monterey Bay FC on December 27, 2022.

References

External links

Mt. SAC bio
Cal State Northridge bio

1998 births
American soccer players
Association football defenders
Cal State Northridge Matadors men's soccer players
Hartford Athletic players
Las Vegas Lights FC players
Living people
Monterey Bay FC players
Soccer players from California
USL Championship players
USL League Two players
Ventura County Fusion players
Weston FC players